A finite-state machine (FSM) or finite-state automaton (FSA, plural: automata), finite automaton, or simply a state machine, is a mathematical model of computation. It is an abstract machine that can be in exactly one of a finite number of states at any given time. The FSM can change from one state to another in response to some inputs; the change from one state to another is called a transition. An FSM is defined by a list of its states, its initial state, and the inputs that trigger each transition. Finite-state machines are of two types—deterministic finite-state machines and non-deterministic finite-state machines. A deterministic finite-state machine can be constructed equivalent to any non-deterministic one.

The behavior of state machines can be observed in many devices in modern society that perform a predetermined sequence of actions depending on a sequence of events with which they are presented. Simple examples are: vending machines, which dispense products when the proper combination of coins is deposited; elevators, whose sequence of stops is determined by the floors requested by riders; traffic lights, which change sequence when cars are waiting; combination locks, which require the input of a sequence of numbers in the proper order.

The finite-state machine has less computational power than some other models of computation such as the Turing machine. The computational power distinction means there are computational tasks that a Turing machine can do but an FSM cannot. This is because an FSM's memory is limited by the number of states it has. A finite-state machine has the same computational power as a Turing machine that is restricted such that its head may only perform "read" operations, and always has to move from left to right. FSMs are studied in the more general field of automata theory.

Example: coin-operated turnstile 

An example of a simple mechanism that can be modeled by a state machine is a turnstile. A turnstile, used to control access to subways and amusement park rides, is a gate with three rotating arms at waist height, one across the entryway. Initially the arms are locked, blocking the entry, preventing patrons from passing through. Depositing a coin or token in a slot on the turnstile unlocks the arms, allowing a single customer to push through. After the customer passes through, the arms are locked again until another coin is inserted.

Considered as a state machine, the turnstile has two possible states: Locked and Unlocked. There are two possible inputs that affect its state: putting a coin in the slot (coin) and pushing the arm (push). In the locked state, pushing on the arm has no effect; no matter how many times the input push is given, it stays in the locked state. Putting a coin in – that is, giving the machine a coin input – shifts the state from Locked to Unlocked. In the unlocked state, putting additional coins in has no effect; that is, giving additional coin inputs does not change the state. However, a customer pushing through the arms, giving a push input, shifts the state back to Locked.

The turnstile state machine can be represented by a state-transition table, showing for each possible state, the transitions between them (based upon the inputs given to the machine) and the outputs resulting from each input:
{| class="wikitable"
! Current State
! Input
! Next State
! Output
|-
! rowspan="2"|Locked
| coin || Unlocked || Unlocks the turnstile so that the customer can push through.
|-
| push || Locked || None
|-
! rowspan="2"|Unlocked
| coin || Unlocked || None
|-
| push || Locked || When the customer has pushed through, locks the turnstile.
|}
The turnstile state machine can also be represented by a directed graph called a state diagram (above). Each state is represented by a node (circle). Edges (arrows) show the transitions from one state to another. Each arrow is labeled with the input that triggers that transition. An input that doesn't cause a change of state (such as a coin input in the Unlocked state) is represented by a circular arrow returning to the original state. The arrow into the Locked node from the black dot indicates it is the initial state.

Concepts and terminology 
A state is a description of the status of a system that is waiting to execute a transition. A transition is a set of actions to be executed when a condition is fulfilled or when an event is received.
For example, when using an audio system to listen to the radio (the system is in the "radio" state), receiving a "next" stimulus results in moving to the next station. When the system is in the "CD" state, the "next" stimulus results in moving to the next track. Identical stimuli trigger different actions depending on the current state.

In some finite-state machine representations, it is also possible to associate actions with a state:
 an entry action: performed when entering the state, and
 an exit action: performed when exiting the state.

Representations

State/Event table 
Several state-transition table types are used. The most common representation is shown below: the combination of current state (e.g. B) and input (e.g. Y) shows the next state (e.g. C). The complete action's information is not directly described in the table and can only be added using footnotes. An FSM definition including the full action's information is possible using state tables (see also virtual finite-state machine).

UML state machines 
The Unified Modeling Language has a notation for describing state machines. UML state machines overcome the limitations of traditional finite-state machines while retaining their main benefits. UML state machines introduce the new concepts of hierarchically nested states and orthogonal regions, while extending the notion of actions. UML state machines have the characteristics of both Mealy machines and Moore machines. They support actions that depend on both the state of the system and the triggering event, as in Mealy machines, as well as entry and exit actions, which are associated with states rather than transitions, as in Moore machines.

SDL state machines 
The Specification and Description Language is a standard from ITU that includes graphical symbols to describe actions in the transition:
 send an event
 receive an event
 start a timer
 cancel a timer
 start another concurrent state machine
 decision
SDL embeds basic data types called "Abstract Data Types", an action language, and an execution semantic in order to make the finite-state machine executable.

Other state diagrams 
There are a large number of variants to represent an FSM such as the one in figure 3.

Usage 
In addition to their use in modeling reactive systems presented here, finite-state machines are significant in many different areas, including electrical engineering, linguistics, computer science, philosophy, biology, mathematics, video game programming, and logic. Finite-state machines are a class of automata studied in automata theory and the theory of computation.
In computer science, finite-state machines are widely used in modeling of application behavior (control theory), design of hardware digital systems, software engineering, compilers, network protocols, and computational linguistics.

Classification 
Finite-state machines can be subdivided into acceptors, classifiers, transducers and sequencers.

Acceptors 

Acceptors (also called detectors or recognizers) produce binary output, indicating whether or not the received input is accepted. Each state of an acceptor is either accepting or non accepting. Once all input has been received, if the current state is an accepting state, the input is accepted; otherwise it is rejected. As a rule, input is a sequence of symbols (characters); actions are not used. The start state can also be an accepting state, in which case the acceptor accepts the empty string. The example in figure 4 shows an acceptor that accepts the string "nice". In this acceptor, the only accepting state is state 7.

A (possibly infinite) set of symbol sequences, called a formal language, is a regular language if there is some acceptor that accepts exactly that set. For example, the set of binary strings with an even number of zeroes is a regular language (cf. Fig. 5), while the set of all strings whose length is a prime number is not.

An acceptor could also be described as defining a language that would contain every string accepted by the acceptor but none of the rejected ones; that language is accepted by the acceptor. By definition, the languages accepted by acceptors are the regular languages.

The problem of determining the language accepted by a given acceptor is an instance of the algebraic path problem—itself a generalization of the shortest path problem to graphs with edges weighted by the elements of an (arbitrary) semiring.

An example of an accepting state appears in Fig. 5: a deterministic finite automaton (DFA) that detects whether the binary input string contains an even number of 0s.

S1 (which is also the start state) indicates the state at which an even number of 0s has been input. S1 is therefore an accepting state. This acceptor will finish in an accept state, if the binary string contains an even number of 0s (including any binary string containing no 0s). Examples of strings accepted by this acceptor are ε (the empty string), 1, 11, 11..., 00, 010, 1010, 10110, etc.

Classifiers 
Classifiers are a generalization of acceptors that produce n-ary output where n is strictly greater than two.

Transducers 

Transducers produce output based on a given input and/or a state using actions. They are used for control applications and in the field of computational linguistics.

In control applications, two types are distinguished:

Moore machine The FSM uses only entry actions, i.e., output depends only on state. The advantage of the Moore model is a simplification of the behaviour. Consider an elevator door. The state machine recognizes two commands: "command_open" and "command_close", which trigger state changes. The entry action (E:) in state "Opening" starts a motor opening the door, the entry action in state "Closing" starts a motor in the other direction closing the door. States "Opened" and "Closed" stop the motor when fully opened or closed. They signal to the outside world (e.g., to other state machines) the situation: "door is open" or "door is closed".

Mealy machine The FSM also uses input actions, i.e., output depends on input and state. The use of a Mealy FSM leads often to a reduction of the number of states. The example in figure 7 shows a Mealy FSM implementing the same behaviour as in the Moore example (the behaviour depends on the implemented FSM execution model and will work, e.g., for virtual FSM but not for event-driven FSM). There are two input actions (I:): "start motor to close the door if command_close arrives" and "start motor in the other direction to open the door if command_open arrives". The "opening" and "closing" intermediate states are not shown.

Sequencers 
Sequencers (also called generators) are a subclass of acceptors and transducers that have a single-letter input alphabet. They produce only one sequence, which can be seen as an output sequence of acceptor or transducer outputs.

Determinism 
A further distinction is between deterministic (DFA) and non-deterministic (NFA, GNFA) automata. In a deterministic automaton, every state has exactly one transition for each possible input. In a non-deterministic automaton, an input can lead to one, more than one, or no transition for a given state. The powerset construction algorithm can transform any nondeterministic automaton into a (usually more complex) deterministic automaton with identical functionality.

A finite-state machine with only one state is called a "combinatorial FSM". It only allows actions upon transition into a state. This concept is useful in cases where a number of finite-state machines are required to work together, and when it is convenient to consider a purely combinatorial part as a form of FSM to suit the design tools.

Alternative semantics 
There are other sets of semantics available to represent state machines. For example, there are tools for modeling and designing logic for embedded controllers. They combine hierarchical state machines (which usually have more than one current state), flow graphs, and truth tables into one language, resulting in a different formalism and set of semantics.  These charts, like Harel's original state machines, support hierarchically nested states, orthogonal regions, state actions, and transition actions.

Mathematical model 
In accordance with the general classification, the following formal definitions are found.

A deterministic finite-state machine or deterministic finite-state acceptor is a quintuple , where:
  is the input alphabet (a finite non-empty set of symbols);
  is a finite non-empty set of states;
  is the state-transition function:  (in a nondeterministic finite automaton it would be , i.e.  would return a set of states);

This is useful in definitions of general state machines, but less useful when transforming the machine. Some algorithms in their default form may require total functions.

A finite-state machine has the same computational power as a Turing machine that is restricted such that its head may only perform "read" operations, and always has to move from left to right. That is, each formal language accepted by a finite-state machine is accepted by such a kind of restricted Turing machine, and vice versa.

A finite-state transducer is a sextuple , where:
  is the input alphabet (a finite non-empty set of symbols);
  is the output alphabet (a finite non-empty set of symbols);
  is a finite non-empty set of states;
  is the state-transition function: ;
  is the output function.

If the output function depends on the state and input symbol that definition corresponds to the Mealy model, and can be modelled as a Mealy machine. If the output function depends only on the state that definition corresponds to the Moore model, and can be modelled as a Moore machine. A finite-state machine with no output function at all is known as a semiautomaton or transition system.

If we disregard the first output symbol of a Moore machine, then it can be readily converted to an output-equivalent Mealy machine by setting the output function of every Mealy transition (i.e. labeling every edge) with the output symbol given of the destination Moore state. The converse transformation is less straightforward because a Mealy machine state may have different output labels on its incoming transitions (edges). Every such state needs to be split in multiple Moore machine states, one for every incident output symbol.

Optimization 

Optimizing an FSM means finding a machine with the minimum number of states that performs the same function. The fastest known algorithm doing this is the Hopcroft minimization algorithm. Other techniques include using an implication table, or the Moore reduction procedure. Additionally, acyclic FSAs can be minimized in linear time.

Implementation

Hardware applications 

In a digital circuit, an FSM may be built using a programmable logic device, a programmable logic controller, logic gates and flip flops or relays. More specifically, a hardware implementation requires a register to store state variables, a block of combinational logic that determines the state transition, and a second block of combinational logic that determines the output of an FSM. One of the classic hardware implementations is the Richards controller.

In a Medvedev machine, the output is directly connected to the state flip-flops minimizing the time delay between flip-flops and output.

Through state encoding for low power state machines may be optimized to minimize power consumption.

Software applications 
The following concepts are commonly used to build software applications with finite-state machines:
 Automata-based programming
 Event-driven finite-state machine
 Virtual finite-state machine
 State design pattern

Finite-state machines and compilers 
Finite automata are often used in the frontend of programming language compilers. Such a frontend may comprise several finite-state machines that implement a lexical analyzer and a parser.
Starting from a sequence of characters, the lexical analyzer builds a sequence of language tokens (such as reserved words, literals, and identifiers) from which the parser builds a syntax tree. The lexical analyzer and the parser handle the regular and context-free parts of the programming language's grammar.

See also 

 Abstract state machines
 Alternating finite automaton
 Communicating finite-state machine
 Control system
 Control table
 Decision tables
 DEVS
 Hidden Markov model
 Petri net
 Pushdown automaton
 Quantum finite automaton
 SCXML
 Semiautomaton
 Semigroup action
 Sequential logic
 State diagram
 Synchronizing word
 Transformation semigroup
 Transition system
 Tree automaton
 Turing machine
 UML state machine

References

Further reading

General 
 
 Wagner, F., "Modeling Software with Finite State Machines: A Practical Approach", Auerbach Publications, 2006, .
 ITU-T, Recommendation Z.100 Specification and Description Language (SDL)
 Samek, M., Practical Statecharts in C/C++, CMP Books, 2002, .
 Samek, M., Practical UML Statecharts in C/C++, 2nd Edition, Newnes, 2008, .
 Gardner, T., Advanced State Management , 2007
 Cassandras, C., Lafortune, S., "Introduction to Discrete Event Systems". Kluwer, 1999, .
 Timothy Kam, Synthesis of Finite State Machines: Functional Optimization. Kluwer Academic Publishers, Boston 1997, 
 Tiziano Villa, Synthesis of Finite State Machines: Logic Optimization. Kluwer Academic Publishers, Boston 1997, 
 Carroll, J., Long, D., Theory of Finite Automata with an Introduction to Formal Languages. Prentice Hall, Englewood Cliffs, 1989.
 Kohavi, Z., Switching and Finite Automata Theory. McGraw-Hill, 1978.
 Gill, A., Introduction to the Theory of Finite-state Machines. McGraw-Hill, 1962.
 Ginsburg, S., An Introduction to Mathematical Machine Theory. Addison-Wesley, 1962.

Finite-state machines (automata theory) in theoretical computer science

Abstract state machines in theoretical computer science

Machine learning using finite-state algorithms

Hardware engineering: state minimization and synthesis of sequential circuits

Finite Markov chain processes 
"We may think of a Markov chain as a process that moves successively through a set of states s1, s2, …, sr. … if it is in state si it moves on to the next stop to state sj with probability pij. These probabilities can be exhibited in the form of a transition matrix" (Kemeny (1959), p. 384)
Finite Markov-chain processes are also known as subshifts of finite type.

 
  Chapter 6 "Finite Markov Chains".

External links 
 
 Modeling a Simple AI behavior using a Finite State Machine Example of usage in Video Games
 Free On-Line Dictionary of Computing description of Finite-State Machines
 NIST Dictionary of Algorithms and Data Structures description of Finite-State Machines
 A brief overview of state machine types, comparing theoretical aspects of Mealy, Moore, Harel & UML state machines.

 
Management cybernetics